D526 connects the A4 motorway Varaždinske Toploce interchange to the D24 state road in Varaždinske Toplice spa town.

The road, as well as all other state roads in Croatia, is managed and maintained by Hrvatske ceste, state owned company.

Traffic volume 

The D526 state road traffic volume is not reported by Hrvatske ceste. However, they regularly count and report traffic volume on the A4 motorway Varaždinske Toplice interchange, which connects to the D526 road only, thus permitting the D526 road traffic volume to be accurately calculated. The report includes no information on ASDT volumes.

Road junctions and populated areas

See also
 A4 motorway

Sources

State roads in Croatia
Varaždin County